Shaukat Ali (10 March 1873– 26 November 1938; Urdu: مولانا شوكت علي) was an Indian Muslim member of the Khilafat Movement. He was the elder brother of the renowned political leader  Mohammad Ali Jouhar.

Early life
Shaukat Ali was born in 1873 in Rampur state in what is today Uttar Pradesh in India but later played role in partition of India on religious lines.  He was educated at the Aligarh Muslim University. He was extremely fond of playing cricket, captaining the university team.

Ali served in the civil service of the United Provinces of Oudh and Agra for 17 years in British India.

Khilafat movement
Shaukat Ali helped his younger brother Mohammad Ali Jauhar to publish the Urdu weekly Hamdard and the English weekly Comrade. In 1915 he published an article which said Turks were right to fight the British. These two weekly magazines played a key role in  shaping the political policy of Muslim India back then. In 1919, while jailed for publishing what the British charged as seditious materials and organizing protests, he was elected as the last president of the Khilafat conference. He was re-arrested and imprisoned from 1921 to 1923 for his support to Mahatma Gandhi and the Indian National Congress during the Non-Cooperation Movement (1919–1922). His fans accorded him and his brother the title of Maulana. In March 1922, he was in Rajkot jail and was later released in 1923.

Though he is widely known as an advocate of non-violence in the struggle against the British colonialists, he supplied guns to Indian revolutionaries like Sachindra Nath Sanyal.

Nehru report 
While still a supporter of Congress and its non-violent ethos, Ali even surpassed  some of his colleagues in also providing support to the revolutionary independence movement. To this end, he supplied guns to Sachindranath Sanyal.

He opposed the 1928 Nehru Report. Instead, he demanded separate electorates for Muslims and finally the Khilafat Committee rejected the Nehru Report.  Shaukat Ali attended the first and second Round Table Conferences (India) in London in 1930-31. His brother Jouhar died in 1931, and Shaukat Ali continued on and organized the World Muslim Conference in Jerusalem.

In 1936, Ali became a member of the All India Muslim League and became a close political ally of and campaigner for Muhammad Ali Jinnah, the future founder of Pakistan. He served as member of the 'Central Assembly' in British India from 1934 to 1938. He travelled all over the Middle East, building support for India's Muslims and the struggle for independence from the British rule in India.

Death and legacy
 
Shaukat Ali died on 26 November 1938 at the residence of Begum Mohammad Ali Jauhar, the widow of his brother, in Karol Bagh, a neighbourhood in Delhi. His body was buried near Jama Masjid, mina bazar in Shaukat Ali Masjid, Delhi on 26 November 1938.

Commemorative postage stamp
Pakistan Postal Services issued a commemorative postage stamp in his honor in 1995 in its 'Pioneers of Freedom' series.

Roads
A street in Mumbai (formerly Grant Road) is named after him.

References

External links 

Maulana Shaukat Ali materials in the South Asian American Digital Archive (SAADA)

1873 births
1938 deaths
Indian independence activists from Uttar Pradesh
Leaders of the Pakistan Movement
People from Rampur, Uttar Pradesh
Aligarh Muslim University alumni
Indian Muslims